Chamba State was one of the oldest princely states in present-day Republic of India, having been founded during the late 6th century. It was part of the States of the Punjab Hills of the Punjab Province of British India from 1859 to 1947. Its last ruler signed the accession to the Indian Union of 15 April 1948.

Geography
Chamba is situated in the bosom of the Himalaya Mountains, and its boundaries are on the northwest, west, and northeast by Kishtwar and Doda district of Jammu region; on the east, Lahaul; and on the southeast and south, the districts of Kangra and Gurdaspur.

The Ravi River flows through this district, and many hydroelectric generating stations have been developed here.

History
According to tradition, the ancient name of Chamba wal "Champa and the predecessor state  was known as "Brahmpur" Later Became Bharmour around 550 AD by Raja Maru Verman Who Came from Kalpagram to Hills of Chamba.In 900s, the capital was Shifted from Bharmour to Present day Chamba Town. The rulers of Chamba State patronized artists of the Pahari painting style. Between 1809 and 1846 Chamba was tributary to Jammu. In 1821, Chamba annexed Bhadrawah State. On 9 Mar 1846, Chamba State became a British protectorate.

Rulers
The rulers of Chamba princely state belonged to the Suryavanshi Mushana(मूषाण) Rajput Dynasty.

Rajas
Raja Sahil Verman Around 920AD shifted His Capital From Bharmaur to Present Day Chamba Town. 
It is believed that King Shail Varman ruled until 940 AD. From then onwards the state of Chamba continued to be ruled by different kings of the Mushana Rajput Dynasty from their capital at Champavati, which later came to be Known as Chamba. Following are some of more famous kings of Chamba in Himachal Pradesh:

        Raja Yugakar Verman
        Raja Vidagdha Verman 
        Raja Dodaka Verman
        Raja Vichitra Verman
        Raja Dhariya Verman
        Raja Salavahana Verman
        Raja Soma Varman
        Raja Asata Varman
        Raja Jasata Verman
        Raja Dhala Verman
        Raja Udayan Varman
        Raja Anand Verman
        Raja Ganesa Verman
        Raja Pratap Singh Verman, (from 1559 to 1586)
        Raja Vir Vahnu Verman (1586 to 1589)
        Raja Balbhadra Verman (1589 to 1641) as Chamba.

        1690 -        1720  Udai Singh                         (b. ... - d. 1720)
        1720 -        1735  Ugar Singh
        1735 -        1794  Raj Singh                          (b. 1735 - d. 1794)
        1794 -        1808  Jit Singh                          (b. 1775 - d. 1808)
        1808 -        1844  Charhat Singh                      (b. 1803 - d. 1844)
        1844 -        1870  Shri Singh                         (b. 1839 - d. 1870)
        1870 -    Apr 1873  Gopal Singh                        (b. 18... - d. 1893)
 17 Apr 1873 – 22 Jan 1904  Sham Singh                         (b. 1866 - d. 1905)
 22 Jan 1904 – 22 Sep 1919  Bhuri Singh                        (b. 1869 - d. 1919)
 22 Sep 1919 -  7 Dec 1935  Ram Singh                          (b. 1890 - d. 1935)
  7 Dec 1935 – 15 Aug 1947  Tikka Lakshman Singh               (b. 1924 - d. 1971)

Demographics

Religion

See also
Political integration of India
Pahari painting

Further reading
 The Princely and Noble Families of the Former Indian Empire: Himachal Pradesh V. 1, by Mark Brentnall. Published by Indus Publishing, 2006. .

Notes

References

External links 

 

Princely states of Himachal Pradesh
Chamba district
Rajputs
States and territories disestablished in 1948
6th-century establishments in India
550 establishments
1948 disestablishments in India
Former monarchies of Asia